Ignacy is a Polish given name. Notable people with the name include:

Ignacy Tadeusz Baranowski (1879–1917), Polish historian
Piotr Ignacy Bieńkowski (1865–1925), Polish classical scholar and archaeologist, professor of Jagiellonian University
Ignacy Bohusz (1720–1778), noble in the Polish-Lithuanian Commonwealth
Ignacy Daszyński (1866–1936), Polish politician, journalist and Prime Minister of the Polish government created in Lublin in 1918
Ignacy Domeyko (1802–1889), 19th-century geologist, mineralogist and educator
Ignacy Działyński (1754–1797), Polish nobleman known for his participation in the Warsaw Uprising of 1794
Ignacy Feliks Dobrzyński (1807–1867), Polish pianist and composer
Ignacy Hryniewiecki (1856–1881), member of the People's Will and the assassin of Tsar Alexander II of Russia
Ignacy Jeż (1914–2007), the Latin Rite Catholic Bishop Emeritus of Koszalin-Kołobrzeg, Poland
Henryk Ignacy Kamieński (1777–1831), Polish brigadier general
Ignacy Krasicki (1735–1801), Primate of Poland, playwright, journalist, encyclopedist and Poland's leading Enlightenment poet
Józef Ignacy Kraszewski (1812–1887), Polish writer, historian and journalist
Ignacy Kruszewski (1799–1879), Polish military leader
Jakub Ignacy Łaszczyński (24 July 1791 – 18 September 1865), Polish regional administrator and President of Warsaw
Ignacy Ledóchowski I (1789–1870), Austrian as well as Polish General, a scion of the Ledóchowski family and Commander of the Fortress Modlin
Aleksander Ignacy Lubomirski (1802–1893), Polish noble, financier and philanthropist
Jerzy Ignacy Lubomirski (1687–1753), Polish nobleman
Ignacy Łukasiewicz (1822–1882), Polish pharmacist and petroleum industry pioneer who in 1856 built the first oil refinery in the world
Ignacy Ścibor Marchocki (1755–1827), Polish noble, famous in the first quarter of the nineteenth century
Ignacy Jakub Massalski (1726–1794), Polish-Lithuanian nobleman
Ignacy Mościcki (1867–1946), Polish chemist, politician, and President of Poland (1926–39)
Ignacy Nagurczewski (1725–1811), Polish writer, translator, educator, and Jesuit
Ignacy Oziewicz (1887–1966), Polish general in World War II, received the Cross of Valour (Poland) four times
Ignacy Jan Paderewski GBE (1860–1941), Polish pianist, composer, diplomat, politician, and the second Prime Minister of the Republic of Poland
Ignacy Pieńkowski (1877–1948), Polish painter and pedagogue active primarily in Kraków
Roman Ignacy Potocki (1750–1809), Polish nobleman, politician and writer
Ignacy Prądzyński (1792–1850), Polish military commander and a general of the Polish Army
Ignacy Sachs (Warsaw, 1927), Polish, naturalized French economist
Ignacy Schwarzbart (1888–1961), prominent Polish Zionist
Ignacy Szymański (1806–1874), Polish and American soldier
Ignacy Tłoczyński (1911–2000), Polish tennis player
Ignacy Tokarczuk (born 1918), Polish prelate of the Roman Catholic Church
Ignacy Witczak, GRU Illegal officer in the United States during World War II
Stanisław Ignacy Witkiewicz (1885–1939), Polish playwright, novelist, painter, photographer and philosopher
Adam Ignacy Zabellewicz (1784–1831), professor of philosophy at Warsaw University
Ignacy Zaborowski (1754–1803), Polish mathematician and geodesist
Ignacy Żagiell (1826–1891), physician, traveler and Polish-language writer
Ignacy Wyssogota Zakrzewski (1745–1802), notable Polish nobleman and politician during the last years of the Polish-Lithuanian Commonwealth

See also
Bydgoszcz Ignacy Jan Paderewski Airport (IATA: BZG, ICAO: EPBY), a Polish regional airport in the city of Bydgoszcz, Poland

Polish masculine given names